Jing is an East Asian surname of Chinese origin.  It is also the pinyin romanization of a number of less-common names including Jīng, Jīng , Jìng (t , s ), Jǐng , and Jǐng .

Surname 景 (Jǐng)
 Jing Junhai (景俊海; 1960-) Chinese politician, serving since 2018 as the Governor of Jilin
 Jing Haipeng (景海鹏, 1966-)  Chinese pilot and astronaut selected as part of the Shenzhou program.

Surname 井 (Jǐng)
 Jing Boran (井柏然; 1989-), Chinese actor and singer
 Jing Junhong (井浚泓, 1968-), Chinese former professional table tennis player
 Jing Yuexiu (井岳秀, 1878-1936), Chinese Warlord of Shaanxi during Warlord Era

Surname 经 (Jīng)
 Jing Shuping (Chinese: 经叔平, 1918 – 2009), Chinese businessman and banker

Surname 荊 (Jīng)
 Jing Ke (荊軻, ? – 227 BC) a retainer of Crown Prince Dan of the Yan state and renowned for his failed assassination attempt of King Zheng of the Qin state

See also 
 Jing: King of Bandits, Japanese manga series
Jing Lee, Australian-Malaysian politician (as first name)

References

Chinese-language surnames
Multiple Chinese surnames